A foreign agent is a person who carries out the interests of a foreign country.

Foreign agent may also refer to:
 Foreign sales agent, a foreign representative of a company
 In the United States, an entity registered under the Foreign Agents Registration Act
 In Russia, an entity registered under the Russian foreign agent law
 Foreign body, in an organism
 A type of router used in Mobile IP
 Foreign Agent, a 1942 American film